The Mask is an American media franchise based on the comic book series of the same name by Dark Horse Comics. 

The franchise revolves around individuals who are transformed into an insane, mischievous gangster with cartoonish superpowers after putting on the titular mask and must overcome dangers that they create while wearing it. 

The first film, The Mask, was released in 1994 after six years of development, with a stand-alone sequel, Son of the Mask, released in 2005. An animated series was also produced and ran for three seasons.

The first film was widely successful, while the second film was critically panned and was a box-office failure.

Background
In 1989, Mike Richardson and Todd Moyer, who was Executive Vice President of Dark Horse Comics, first approached New Line Cinema about adapting the comic series The Mask into a film, after having seen other offers. The main character went through several transformations, and the project was stalled a couple of times.

Initially intended to become a new horror franchise, New Line Cinema offered the job of directing the film to Charles Russell, known for directing such films. However, Russell found the violence of the comic to be off-putting, and wanted the film to be less grim and more fun than the source material.

Films

The Mask (1994)

Unfortunate bank clerk Stanley Ipkiss (Jim Carrey) finds a magical mask that transforms him into a mischievous, good-hearted gangster with cartoon-like superpowers.

Son of the Mask (2005)

After Loki (Alan Cumming) is dispatched to Earth to retrieve the Mask, cartoonist Tim Avery (Jamie Kennedy) inadvertently uses it to conceive a child, who inherits its powers.

Television

The Mask: Animated Series (1995–1997)

Stanley Ipkiss (voiced by Rob Paulsen) continues to use the magical mask to fight crime and the supervillains as the mischievous, cartoonish, good-hearted superhero known as the "Mask", while having fun and partying at the same time. In this continuity, Stanley still has the mask. He either pretended to throw it away, or Milo retrieved it from the river. As well, in this series, Stanley can use the mask during both day and night, whereas in the film, it only worked at night.

Cast and characters
 A  indicates the actor or actress lent only his or her voice for his or her film character.

Additional crew and production details

Other appearances

Video game

A side-scrolling action game based on the first film was released for the Super Nintendo Entertainment System in 1995.

References

Film series introduced in 1994
Comedy film franchises
New Line Cinema franchises